{{DISPLAYTITLE:Delta1 Telescopii}}

Delta1 Telescopii is a blue-white-hued binary star system in the southern constellation of Telescopium. It is faintly visible to the naked eye, having an apparent visual magnitude of 4.94. Based upon an annual parallax shift of 4.61 mas as seen from Earth, this system is roughly 710 light-years from the Sun. At that distance, the visual magnitude is diminished by an extinction factor of 0.29 due to interstellar dust.

This system is a single-lined spectroscopic binary with an orbital period of 18.8 days and an eccentricity of 0.51. The primary, component A, has a stellar classification of B6 IV, suggesting it is an evolving B-type subgiant star. Delta1 Telescopii has an estimated 4.5 times the mass of the Sun and about 4.7 times the Sun's radius.

References

B-type subgiants
Spectroscopic binaries
Telescopii, Delta
Telescopium (constellation)
170523
090853
6938
Durchmusterung objects